Andres Apolonio "Drew" Macias (born March 7, 1983) is an American former professional baseball outfielder.

Macias attended Chaffey College and was drafted in the 35th round by the Padres in the 2002 Major League Baseball Draft and signed on May 18, .

Professional career

San Diego Padres
He was tied for fourth in the Pioneer League in stolen bases with 15. He led the team in hits, triples, steals, runs scored, sacrifices, games and at-bats. He was promoted to the Class-A Fort Wayne TinCaps on August 31 and made his season finale that night going 0-2.

In  Macias played his first full season at Class-A Fort Wayne where he appeared in 129 games, batting .266 with 18 doubles, five triples, eight home runs and 55 RBIs. He led the Wizards in sacrifices with four while ranking second in triples, sacrifice flies, with six, and games played. Hit .321 with runners in scoring position.

He established career highs in average, hits, doubles, triples, RBIs, runs scored and at-bats.

In , Macias went back to Double-A with the San Antonio Missions, where he hit .288, scored 92 runs, and drew a career high 83 walks. Macias was again called up to San Diego on September 6,  and was impressive in his first major league start in the outfield, chalking up 3 hits in 5 at-bats, 2 RBIs and a home run into the right field bleachers for his first major league hit.

Macias split the  season between the Triple-A Portland Beavers and the Padres. With the Beavers he hit .232 with five home runs 27 RBIs and five steals. With the Padres he hit .197 with one home runs, seven RBIs and eight runs.

Arizona Diamondbacks
Macias was signed to a minor league contract which included an invitation to spring training by the Arizona Diamondbacks on December 4, 2009.

Return to San Diego
After starting 2011 with the independent Camden Riversharks, Macias signed a minor league contract with the Padres in August.

Los Angeles Angels of Anaheim
On January 11, 2012, Macias signed a minor league deal with the Los Angeles Angels of Anaheim that included an invitation to spring training.

He was released by Los Angeles Angles March 29, 2012 and is currently with the Camden Riversharks.

External links

1983 births
Living people
Baseball players from California
Camden Riversharks players
Chaffey College alumni
Chaffey Panthers baseball players
Fort Wayne Wizards players
Idaho Falls Padres players
Lake Elsinore Storm players
Leones del Caracas players
American expatriate baseball players in Venezuela
Major League Baseball outfielders
Mobile BayBears players
Naranjeros de Hermosillo players
American expatriate baseball players in Mexico
Portland Beavers players
Reno Aces players
San Antonio Missions players
San Diego Padres players
Tucson Padres players